Rajko Strugar (born 11 April 1995) is a Montenegrin male volleyball who last played as a setter for Ukrainian club Reshetylivka and the Montenegro national team.

References

1995 births
Living people
Sportspeople from Cetinje
Montenegrin men's volleyball players